Multipart may refer to:
a multipart message in the MIME internet format
Multipart Solutions, a British parts and components supplier
multipart download or download acceleration